Tutima Uhrenfabrik GmbH Ndl. Glashütte is a German watchmaker established in 1927  in Glashütte, Saxony.

Tutima has five product lines made in Glashütte: Patria, M2, Saxon One, Grand Flieger, and Sky.

Tutima Germany is registered with HRB 140173 at Amtsgericht Delmenhorst and is a member of Industrie und Handelskammer Oldenburg. The brand Tutima has been registered since 7 April 1970. Tutima USA, Inc., an independent company, is based in Torrance, California.

See also
List of German watch manufacturers
Glashütte Original

References

External links
tutima.com - official website

Design companies established in 1927
Watch brands
Manufacturing companies of Germany
Industry in Lower Saxony
Watch manufacturing companies of Germany
Manufacturing companies established in 1927
Glashütte